"Delirio Mind" is a song by the Italian Italo disco band Scotch, written by singers Vince Lancini and Fabio Margutti.

Background 

"Delirio Mind" was written by Vince Lancini and Fabio Margutti.

Track listing 

 Italian 12-inch single

A. "Delirio Mind" – 5:37
B. "Man in the Man" – 3:30

 German 7-inch single

A. "Delirio Mind (First Version)" – 3:35
B. "Man in the Man" – 3:28

 German 12-inch single

A. "Delirio Mind" – 4:35
B. "Man in the Man" – 3:28

Personnel 

Scotch

 Vince Lancini – lead and harmony vocals
 Fabio Margutti – keyboards

Charts

Weekly charts

Year-end charts

References

External links 

 

1984 songs
1985 singles
Scotch (band) songs
ZYX Music singles